Bülent Tekin (born 15 February 1954), Kurdish poet and writer, Turkish citizen. In the 1970s he wrote two novels (“Son” and “Money”), a collection of “Social Poems”, and a research document on the socialism in Allende's Chile, all four of which were confiscated by the police, thus “lost” and unpublished. He contributed to Gırgır, a leading satirical journal. Tekin prepared a TV program of political analysis for Dijle TV. He is married with two children.

Childhood
He was born in the town called Derik, where he began primary school. Soon his father Abdülaziz Tekin (Azîzê Pîrê) decided to send him to a school in Mardin for a better education. Thanks to the friendship between their families, Bülent Tekin and Murathan Mungan (also a poet and novelist) became childhood friends. Tekin attended two years of middle school in Ankara and the third year in Çermik. He finished high school in Diyarbakır, at Ziya Gökalp Lisesi.

Literary Life
He was impressed by the stories and tales he was told in his childhood and he started to write. At Primary School (Mardin Ebul’ula Ilkokulu) he won the first prize for writing a composition, organized by the Governorship of Mardin. He began writing poems in high school. He wrote two novels at university, while also writing poetry.

Politics
In the 1970s he was an active member of Istanbul Cultural Association of Higher Education (İYÖKD).  He focussed on the Kurdish question. Due to several obstacles, he did not graduate from either the Chemistry Department or the Faculty of Law. He took place on the stage of Kurdistan Revolutinory and at the beginning of the PKK. During the mid 1970s he was active in the movement called The Voice of the Kurdistan Revolution. (KDS)

Works
Kızıldan Sarıya, (From Red to Yellow), Poetry 
Tarih Tarih Olsun, (Let History be History), Poetry 
Sevdanla Yaşayacaksan, (If you will live with your Love), Poetry 
Kral Situ’nun Hikâyesi, (King Situ's Story), Novel 
Barışla Güzeldir Sevdam, (My Love is Beautiful with Peace), Poetry 
Feyyo’nun Felsefesi, (Feyyo's Philosophy), Novel 
Ölümü Vurmak Güneşi Öpmek, (Shooting Death and Kissing the Sun), Poetry 
Bir Türkiye Çıkmazı, (Deadend specific to Turkey), Essays 
Kartal Yuvası-Mardin Tarihçedir, (Eagle's Nest-Mardin is History), Historical Novel 
Köpekleşmenin Şerefi, (Honour of Becoming a Dog), Satire 
Vatan Millet Diyarbakır, (Homeland Nation Diyarbakır), Satire 
Kürt Sorunu Ve Sayılmayan İsyanlar, (Kurdish Question and the Uprises not considered), Analysis

Ana Tanrıçadan Modern Köleye, (From The Mother Goddess To The Modern Slave) Essays

See also 
Kurdish Poetry

Kurdish Literature

References

External links
 Official website
 Poems
 Articles

1954 births
Turkish Kurdish people
Living people
Kurdish writers
People from Mardin
Turkish people of Kurdish descent
Kurdish poets
Turkish-language writers